Mohamed Morsi Hussein (8 April 1939 – 28 September 1965), known as Reda, was an Egyptian footballer. He competed in the men's tournament at the 1960 Summer Olympics.

References

External links
 
 

1939 births
1965 deaths
Egyptian footballers
Egypt international footballers
Olympic footballers of Egypt
Footballers at the 1960 Summer Olympics
Footballers from Cairo
Association football forwards